The Bundesgesetzblatt für die Republik Österreich (BGBl.) (Federal Law Gazette for the Republic of Austria) is an official gazette in Austria for the announcement of federal laws, ministerial decrees, proclamations and pronouncements of the Chancellor, resolutions of the President as well as international treaties and other supranational law.

References

Law of Austria
Government gazettes